Ora is a village in the Larnaca District of Cyprus. The settlements of Parsata and Drapeia are part of the municipality. Its population in 2011 was 206.

References

Communities in Larnaca District